The Contact is a 1963 British educational short film directed by Philip Wrestler. It stars John Hurt in one of his first film roles, as a physically disabled teenager with cerebral palsy. The film was sponsored by the Spastics Society and designed to educate and combat prejudice against disabled people among young people. The film also featured early appearances by Pauline Collins and Wendy Richard.

References

External links
 

1963 films
1960s educational films
British short films
1960s English-language films
British educational films